The House of Antelminelli was a noble family from Lucca. The family was involved in the struggle between the Guelph and the Ghibellini parties in Tuscany.  The leader of the family in the early 14th century was Castruccio Castracani a famous Ghibelline leader. Serving under the Ghibelline chief, Uguccione della Faggiuola, he was elected lord (as lifelong consul) of Lucca on June 12, 1316, displacing  the Quartigiani family, and was appointed Duke of Lucca, Pistoia, Volterra and Luni by emperor Frederick of Austria. In the following generation the power of the family collapsed in the general success of the Guelfs.

References

External links
 Note biografiche di Capitani di Guerra e di Condottieri di Ventura operanti in Italia nel 1330 - 1550: Castruccio Castracani
 Martin W. Walsh: LUCCA MARTINMAS, 1325: The Despicable Festive Humiliation of Florentine Prisoners of War by Castruccio Castracani (2004)
 Niccolò Machiavelli
 Niccolò Machiavelli: Vita di Castruccio
 Costanza Moscheni: Castruccio - poema epico (1811)
 Domenico Luigi Moscheni: Notizie istoriche intorno la vita di Castruccio degli Antelminelli Castracani (1811)
 Mary Shelley: Valperga: or, the Life and Adventures of Castruccio, prince of Lucca (1823)
 Lilla Maria Crisafulli: Letitia Elizabeth Landon's Castruccio Castrucani: Gender Through History

Surnames
Families of Lucca
Antelminelli